Windsor & Eton Central station is one of two terminal stations serving the town of Windsor, Berkshire, England. Although a small part is still a railway station, most of the station building has been converted into a tourist-oriented shopping centre, called Windsor Royal Shopping. It is situated on the High Street, almost immediately opposite Castle Hill, the main public entrance to Windsor Castle.

Originally named simply Windsor, the station was renamed twice: first to Windsor & Eton on 1 June 1904; and then to Windsor & Eton Central on 26 September 1949.

The station is the terminus of a branch line from  operated by Great Western Railway.

History

Construction

Windsor Station opened on 8 October 1849 on the completion of the branch line from Slough but only after considerable opposition from the leadership at Eton College, which was convinced that the proximity of a railway would lead the Eton boys astray.

An extension of the branch was planned in 1871–72 to connect to the south via Dedworth and Ascot. It was planned to diverge west from the viaduct, just to the south of the river bridge. Despite reaching an advanced stage of design and with some property purchased plus the construction of a possible station building, the plans were never completed and were abandoned completely by 1914.

The Metropolitan and District railways
When, in 1863, the Metropolitan Railway opened the world's first underground railway, between London Paddington and Farringdon Street in the City of London, the Great Western Railway ran regular through services to Windsor from Farringdon. Initially these were broad gauge trains, as the original Metropolitan was laid for mixed standard and broad gauges and, for some months, the engines and coaches were hired from the GWR. By 1865, there were ten trains daily on the route.

Later the District Railway expanded its services to the west of London. On 1 March 1883, it started a service to Windsor from Mansion House, using the Great Western main line. The service was discontinued on 30 September 1885.

The structure
The station is approached by a  brick viaduct and Windsor Railway Bridge, the last surviving wrought iron bridge designed by Isambard Kingdom Brunel. The original building was little more than a glorified train shed. This was completely rebuilt by the Great Western Railway for Queen Victoria's Diamond Jubilee, with a much grander frontage and an interior reminiscent of Paddington. Two island platforms and a bay on the south side were provided. A royal waiting room existed on platform 4. Having last been used during the funeral of George V in January 1936, in 1950 it was converted for use by the British Transport Police.

The goods yard

To the north of the station, a large goods yard was laid out between the station and the River Thames at ground level. Since the station was built somewhat higher up, the yard had to be reached by a steep incline built against the side of the viaduct. It sloped down towards a short headshunt, near the river bridge, which allowed switchback access to the yard sidings. This arrangement limited the number of wagons that could be transferred to and from the sidings in one go. In addition to serving the populace of Windsor and surrounding area, the yard provided a depot for Windsor gas works, receiving loads of coal and removing coke and tar.

When freight services ceased in the 1960s, the goods yard and incline were removed. The yard became a coach park but, on the side of the viaduct, it is possible to see where the incline was.

Decline
On 17 November 1968, platforms 3 and 4 were taken out of use, followed on 5 September 1969 by platform 2. Later, the remaining platform was also truncated, twice, at each rebuild of the station.

Royalty & Empire

In 1982 British Railways and Madame Tussauds restored the station, creating an exhibition called Royalty & Empire (initially Royalty & Railways). The exhibition recalled the Diamond Jubilee of Queen Victoria in 1897, using displays of wax models and an audio-visual show featuring early Audio-Animatronic figures.

After entering the exhibition via the ticket office, visitors would be greeted by a scene on the platform depicting the arrival of the Royal Train, complete with figures of station staff and a full size replica train.

A full-size replica steam locomotive GWR 3031 Class named The Queen was built at Steamtown, Carnforth, and this was combined with an ex South Eastern & Chatham Railway tender and fittings from a GWR tender. The locomotive's bogie and rear wheels are also from another GWR tender, but the large driving wheels are only half complete (the lower half) and they do not sit directly on the rails. This allowed the locomotive to be rolled into position when the exhibition was built. The replica was completed in December 1982 and delivered by road in January 1983. Two mobile cranes hoisted it onto the viaduct, then it was rolled into position on temporary track. Tussaud's fitted smoke and steam generators so that steam was emitted from the cab, whistles and safety valves, and smoke from the chimney. A sound unit was also fitted.

Two carriages were used to form a replica of the Royal Train. Directly behind the loco was No. 229, a replica coach mounted on an ex-British Railways BG Full Brake underframe and containing waxwork figures of various members of the Royal Family. The second coach was the original Royal Day Saloon No. 9002 that was rescued for the exhibition from a cliff top in Aberporth, Wales.

After leaving the platform, visitors could see the restored royal waiting room with figures of Queen Victoria and the Prince and Princess of Wales, before entering 'The Royal Parade' area. A walkway was constructed up and around the canopy, allowing visitors to view figures of the royal party exiting the waiting room and the queen boarding her Ascot landau. Over seventy wax figures of 2nd Battalion Coldstream Guards formed part of this scene.

The last part of the exhibit was the 'Sixty Glorious Years' audio-visual show. The show outlined the growth of Great Britain using slides and projections, before the screen sank to reveal moving animatronic figures of some of the great personalities of the Victorian age, including Queen Victoria herself.

The exhibition closed in the late 1990s and almost all of the exhibits were taken away. The locomotive The Queen was too expensive to remove, so, rather than being cut up, it was incorporated as a feature of a restaurant on the concourse where it remains today. The tender – the only original (and historic) part of the replica engine – was sold to a scrap dealer and cut up, although the springs and axleboxes were salvaged for use in the replica London, Brighton & South Coast Railway Atlantic project at the Bluebell Railway, and part of one side was rescued by the Slough and Windsor Railway Society, where it is now on display. The original Royal Saloon No. 9002 is preserved at the Museum of the Great Western Railway. It is not known what happened to the replica coach. The Royal Waiting Room is part of a restaurant on the concourse.

Present day

In 1997, Axa bought the station buildings and enlarged and remodelled them as a shopping complex called Windsor Royal Shopping. The single platform was truncated still further, and can now handle no more than a four coach train.

Windsor Link Railway
The Windsor Link Railway was a 2009 proposal for a new railway connecting the Great Western and South West Trains franchise areas and potentially linking both to Heathrow Airport. Windsor & Eton Central and Windsor & Eton Riverside railway stations would have been replaced with one through-route station in the Windsor Goswells. 

The proposal was rejected by the government in December 2018.

In popular culture
Being not far from Pinewood Studios, Central station was extensively used in Carry On Loving, one of the Carry On films. The film was released in 1970, at which time much of the original station was still intact. In the opening sequence, the station doubles as 'Much-Snogging-On-The-Green', where Terry Scott's character boards a British Rail DMU. Later in the film, the taxi rank and approaches to the station are used as Sidney Bliss (Sid James) boards a taxi after being followed into the toilets by Charles Hawtrey in disguise.

Railway scenes in the Robert Donat film Lease of Life (1954) were filmed at Windsor & Eton Central station.

The interior of the station was used for scenes in the 1973 Richard Beckinsale and Paula Wilcox film The Lovers!.

Services
Windsor & Eton Central station is served by a Great Western Railway operated shuttle service from Slough. The journey takes six minutes each way, and return trips run every 20 minutes.

References

External links

Buildings and structures in Windsor, Berkshire
Grade II listed buildings in Berkshire
Railway stations in Berkshire
DfT Category D stations
Former Great Western Railway stations
Railway stations in Great Britain opened in 1849
Railway stations served by Great Western Railway
1849 establishments in England
Grade II listed railway stations